The Afghanistan cricket team toured the United Arab Emirates to play Oman in November 2015. The tour consisted of two Twenty20 International (T20I) matches and a tour match. Afghanistan won the 2-match series 2–0. The matches were in preparation for the 2016 Asia Cup Qualifier.

Squads

Tour match

Three-day: United Arab Emirates v Oman

T20I series

1st T20I

2nd T20I

References

External links
 Series home at ESPNcricinfo

2015 in Afghan cricket
2015 in Omani cricket
International cricket competitions in 2015–16
Afghan cricket tours of the United Arab Emirates
Omani cricket tours of the United Arab Emirates
Afghan 2015